Pähl am Ammersee is a municipality in the Weilheim-Schongau district, in Bavaria, Germany.  It is on the lake of Ammersee to the southwest of Munich.

Famous people 
 Thomas Müller, footballer for Bayern Munich and Germany, grew up in the area.
Franz-Ludwig Schenk Graf von Stauffenberg, lawyer, birthplace of his wife in this area.
 Duchess Sophie Charlotte in Bavaria met Edgar Hanfstaengl there.

References 

Weilheim-Schongau
Ammersee